The 1952 Florida A&M Rattlers football team was an American football team that represented Florida A&M University as a member of the Southern Intercollegiate Athletic Conference (SIAC) during the 1952 college football season. In their eighth season under head coach Jake Gaither, the Rattlers compiled an 8–2 record, including a victory over Virginia State in the Orange Blossom Classic. The team played its home games at Bragg Stadium in Tallahassee, Florida.

The Pittsburgh Courier also selected Florida A&M as the national champion under its "Courier DoubleR" rating system, ahead of second-place  and third-place Lincoln (MO).

Schedule

References

Florida AandM
Florida A&M Rattlers football seasons
Black college football national champions
Florida AandM Rattlers football